Nina Paw Hee-ching (in Chinese 鮑起靜, born 20 July 1949) is a Hong Kong actress. Paw got her start in film but came into prominence portraying mothers on ATV television dramas, such as Fatherland (1980). Having portrayed many mother and elder sister roles throughout her career, she is often referred to as "Sister Paw". Her portrayal of a working mother in The Way We Are (2008) won her four best actress awards, including Best Actress at the 28th Hong Kong Film Awards.

Early life 
Paw grew up in a Kowloon City apartment with her parents, grandparents, and two siblings. She graduated from Heung To Middle School in 1968.

Career 
Paw joined Great Wall Film Production in 1968 for ten years. She was known for starring in the lead role of White Hair Devil Lady (1980) opposite Henry Fong Ping.

Paw joined Asia Television in the 1980s, playing mostly motherly roles. When offered a job at competing TVB, she declined as her infotainment hosting schedule at ATV allowed her to spend more time raising her daughter. She worked at ATV for 33 years before moving to Hong Kong Television Network in 2012.

In September 2016, she acted in the first TV drama "Allied" for TVB, and was selected as one of the final five finalists for "Best Actress" in the "Million Stars Awards 2017".

In 2019, New World Development, which is responsible for the Hong Kong Avenue of Stars project, said that nine new movie queens, including Pao Kee-ching, had been added to the Avenue of Stars after its reopening on 31 January.

In 2020, it participated in the joint sign-up to support the Hong Kong version of the National Security Law.

Personal life 
Her parents are actors Bao Fong and Liu Su. She has an older sister, Her younger brother is cinematographer Peter Pau.

She is married to Henry Fong Ping, who is also an actor. She has one daughter.

She resided on Hong Kong Island.

Filmography

Films and television dramas

Music video

References

External links
 
 Hong Kong Cinemagic: Nina Pau Hei Ching

1949 births
Hong Kong film actresses
Hong Kong television actresses
Asia Television
Living people
20th-century Hong Kong actresses
21st-century Hong Kong actresses